Excel is a spreadsheet program by Microsoft Corporation.

Excel may also refer to:

Companies 
 Excel Airways
 Excel Communications, a telephone company in Irving, Texas
 Excel Entertainment Pvt. Ltd., a film studio based in Mumbai, India
 Excel mobile phones
 Excel Records, a record label
 Excel, a division of Cargill Meat Solutions

Places 
 Excel, Alabama, a town in the United States
 EXCEL High School, a public secondary school in Oakland, California
 ExCeL London (Exhibition Centre London), England
 Excel, Alberta, a locality in Canada
 Excel No. 71, Saskatchewan, a rural municipality in Saskatchewan, Canada
 Excel Township, Marshall County, Minnesota

Vehicles

Aircraft
 Cessna Citation Excel, an American midsize business jet
 Edel Excel, a South Korean paraglider design
 Europe Sails Excel, an Austrian hang glider

Road vehicles
 Excel (automobile), a 1914 American cyclecar
 Hyundai Excel, a 1985–1999 South Korean subcompact car
 Lotus Excel, a 1982–1992 British sports car
 Optare Excel, a 1995–2004 British low-floor single-decker bus

Ships
 USS Excel (AM-94), a minesweeper launched in 1942
 USS Excel (AM-439), a minesweeper launched in 1953

Other uses
 Excel (gum), a brand of chewing gum produced by Wrigley's
 Excel (band), a thrash-punk band from Venice, California
 Excel (Excel Saga), a character in Excel Saga
 Excel, a 6-row malting barley variety

See also 
 Edexcel
 Excell
 Excellent (disambiguation)
 Excelsior (disambiguation)
 USS Excel, a list of ships of the U.S. Navy
 Xcel Energy
 XL (disambiguation)